The Japanese Peace Bell is a bell donated to the United Nations Headquarters in New York City via the United Nations Association of Japan in June 1954. It is a bonsho (a Buddhist temple bell) that is 60 centimeters in diameter, 1 meter in height, and 116 kg in weight. It was established by Chiyoji Nakagawa.

Ceremonies are held at the opening of the United Nations General Assembly in September each year as well as on the International Day of Peace on September 21, when the bell is rung in honor of world peace by the Secretary General, UN executives, and other public figures.

Description

In 1951, Chiyoji Nakagawa, who was a then-current council member of the UN Association of Japan and later became the mayor of Uwajima City (Ehime prefecture), participated in the 6th General Assembly of the United Nations held in Paris at his own expense as an observer from Uwajima, a city located in the south-west of the Shikoku region. With the aid of Benjamin Cohen, the Secretary General, he appealed to national representatives: “I want to collect coins and medals from people all over the world, going beyond differences in ideas, principles, regions, races, and nationalities, to melt them into one molded piece to cast a bell as a symbol of the wish for peace and present it to the United Nations headquarters. I want the bell to be tolled for peace.”

No objection was raised from the representatives; the proposal was approved unanimously and officially accepted by the UN Economic and Social Council in the following year. They decided to place the bell in the Japanese Garden of the United Nations headquarters as the “Japanese Peace Bell.”  

Starting from the coins received from representatives from more than sixty countries that endorsed the purpose and 9 gold coins from Pius XII, the Pope of Rome, Nakagawa spent three years visiting countries over the world to collect the coins and commissioned Tada Foundry in Takamatsu City (Kagawa Prefecture) to found the bell.

The Japanese characters “世界絶対平和萬歳” ((hep: sekai zettai heiwa banzai), lit. “long live absolute world peace”) are inscribed on the bell, and the sun and the moon are surrounded by laurel, depicted at the point hit by the wooden bell hammer.  The belfry, built by Rinpei Oshita, a traditional architectural craftsman in Uwajima, was made in the shape of the blossom temple where Buddha was born and transported to New York from Yokohama Port in 1954 by the Tsuneshima-maru, owned by Iino Kaiun Kaisha, as the maiden voyage for the ship.  A handful of sand from atom-bombed areas was sent by a chief Zen priest in Hiroshima and a female Christian student in Nagasaki who survived the bombing, to be carried with the bell and buried under the foundation stone for the belfry. The bell and the belfry were installed in the UN headquarters and a presentation ceremony was held on June 8.

Currently, the Japanese Peace Bell is located in the Japanese Garden of the UN headquarters, and is rung twice a year: around Earth Day on March 21, and for the International Day of Peace on September 21. Notably on the International Day of Peace, the UN Secretary General rings the bell to pray for world peace in the presence of the UN executives, other UN members, and celebrities.

Casting of the Japanese Peace Bell 
It is a bronze Buddhist temple bell of 60 cm in diameter, 1 meter in height, and 116 kg in weight. Chiyoji traveled countries all over the world to collect the coins that were used to make it. He received old and current coins, sable guards, bullets, bronze medals, badges of various denominations, and copper plates from a wide variety of people. These were melted down and used for casting, along with the coins received from the representatives of more than sixty countries who participated in the 6th General Assembly of the United Nations held in Paris and the 9 gold coins given by Pius XII, the Pope of Rome.

Chiyoji commissioned Jonosuke Tada XIV, of the distinguished Tada Foundry, to cast the bell and Rinpei Oshita, a traditional architectural craftsman from Uwajima, to build the belfry.

Osaka Expo and the Peace Bell 
After installing the Japanese Peace Bell in the UN headquarters in New York, Chiyoji Nakagawa began a series of activities to promote world peace centered around the bell.  At the time of the Cuban Missile Crisis in 1961 during the cold war between the US and the Soviet Union, he visited the embassies of both countries and presented replicas of the Japanese Peace Bell, weighing 4 kg each, as sister bells to President Kennedy and Prime Minister Khrushchev via the embassies, with a message: “World peace can be maintained with a little consideration and with smiles.” 

When the Expo 1970 was held in Osaka , he sought permission from U Thant, then-current Secretary General of the United Nations, to temporarily bring the Japanese Peace Bell back from the UN headquarters to the Expo site in Osaka to promote the Japanese Peace Bell as people gathered there from all across the world.

He meanwhile cast a similar bell to replace the original, to fill its absence at UN headquarters. The bells were exchanged again after the Expo and the original Japanese Peace Bell was returned to the UN.  

The Peace Bell in Expo '70 Commemorative Park is a replacement of the bell used at the UN headquarters. At the same time as the Expo, Chiyoji produced 150 replicas of 1 kg in weight from same coins used for the original Japanese Peace Bell. He visited the embassies of 140 countries with Secretariat-General U Thant and presented them to the heads of states.

(List of bells presented to the countries around the world by Chiyoji Nakagawa)

Association for the Preservation of UN Peace Bell (General Incorporated Association) 
The Association for the Preservation of UN Peace Bell (General Incorporated Association) started its activities in 2013 and Nakagawa’s daughter Seiko Takase established the organization as and served as its representative in 2015, 43 years after her father’s death.  The association established the organization under the premise that the existence of the Japanese Peace Bell donated to the United Nations and her father’s hope for world peace were not properly conveyed or communicated by the media.  The association’s activities and name were approved by the United Nations in the same year.

Seiko Takase, as the association’s representative, participates in the bell ringing ceremony held in the UN headquarters in New York every year.

Activities of the Association for the Preservation of UN Peace Bell 

 Bell ringing ceremony at the UN headquarters
 Bell ringing ceremony at the Expo '70 Commemorative Park. In the fall, the association hosts a ceremony to ring the sister bell of the Japanese Peace Bell at the Expo '70 Commemorative Park in cooperation with the Osaka Prefectural Government.
 Workshops with children
 On behalf of the association, Seiko Takase visits primary and junior high schools and local events nationwide to give lectures about the history and background of the Japanese Peace Bell.  The number of participants in the lectures has exceeded 5,000 in total.  She also published a picture story book about the Japanese Peace Bell in the UN headquarters with an English translation.  The book is available at the UN headquarters in New York.
 In 2017: presented a replica bell of 4 kg in weight to the Myanmar government.
 In 2019: visited the Bosnia and Herzegovina government and presented a replica bell of 4 kg in weight.

In 2019, the association was asked about donating a Japanese Peace Bell to the Republic of San Marino through the intermediation of the San Marino Nippon Matsuri (Japan Festival) Executive Committee, which maintains cultural exchange activities with the country, known as the world’s oldest republic with no record of war.  In November, a member of Parliament of San Marino who was Head of Cabinet of the former Minister of Culture came to Japan and had a meeting with Representative Takase.  They agreed on the donation of a sister Peace Bell, which is slightly smaller than the original – 80 cm in height, 45 in diameters, and 90 kg in weight – and obtained approval from the Japanese Ministry of Foreign Affairs and the United Nations.  This bell would be the fourth largest, following the parent bell in Taihei Temple in Uwajima, the Japanese Peace Bell at the UN headquarters, and the sister bell at the Expo ’70 Commemorative Park.  The bell is planned to be installed in view of the Liberty Square, the Republic’s historical area, a World Heritage site.

The Republic of San Marino paid tribute to the donation of the bell, symbolic of the country being decorated for its long history as a country of freedom, without engaging in war.  

The same materials were used for this peace bell as the Japanese Peace Bell at UN headquarters and coins were also donated by the people from both countries.

A presentation ceremony for the Peace Bell was initially scheduled at the finale of the San Marino Nippon Matsuri (Japan Festival) on June 21, 2020, but was postponed due to the COVID-19 pandemic.  An unveiling ceremony was held in December 2020 under an illuminated Nakadori Avenue, in front of the Shin-Marunouchi Building in Tokyo.

At the moment, the Association for the Preservation of UN Peace Bell is developing activities with the help of new participants and cultural influences with the goal of eliminating issues targeted by the UN’s SDGs, including poverty, famine, environmental destruction, and racial discrimination.

Events and function

Sounding the bell
Traditionally, the Japanese Peace Bell is rung twice a year.  It is tolled on the first day of Spring at the time of the vernal equinox, in celebration of the annual Earth Day ceremony initiated by Earth Day Founder, John McConnell.

It is also tolled on every opening day of the UN General Assembly's yearly session in September, coinciding with the International Day of Peace established by the General Assembly in 1981. This occasion is observed by the Secretary-General.

The bell was tolled on October 4, 1966 during the Feast Day of St. Francis, marking the one year anniversary of Pope Paul VI's official visit to the United Nations.

The Bell is infrequently tolled on other special occasions.

Earth Day celebrations 
On Earth Day every year the Earth Society Foundation (founded by John McConnell), is responsible for the Earth Day celebrations that take place at the United Nations Headquarters in New York City. Each year different Honorees are selected to ring the Japanese Peace Bell as part of the celebration.

List of Peace Bell honorees

Commemoration

Anniversaries
In 1994, a special ceremony marked the fortieth anniversary of the Japanese Peace Bell.  During the occasion, Secretary-General Boutros Boutros-Ghali reiterated that

 "Whenever it has sounded, this Japanese Peace Bell has sent a clear message. The message is addressed to all humanity. Peace is precious. It is not enough to yearn for peace. Peace requires work -- long, hard, difficult work."

In print
A stamp series of the Japanese Peace Bell, designed by Ole Hamann of Denmark, was issued in 1970 as part of the United Nations Postal Service's Art at the United Nations series. The stamps were printed by the Government Printing Bureau of Tokyo.

See also
 United Nations Art Collection

References

External links
Brief History Of The Original Peace Bell In New York City
Japanese Peace Bell, United Nations, UN.org, 2001
Association for preservation of UN Peace Bell

Buildings and structures completed in 1952
Diplomatic gifts
Individual bells in the United States
Japan and the United Nations
Peace monuments and memorials
Peace symbols
United Nations art collection
United Nations properties